St. Francis Catholic Secondary School (abbreviated as SFCSS) is a private Catholic secondary school, located in  Idimu, Lagos, Nigeria. The school was founded in 1990 by Francis Cusimano and is run by the North-West Africa Province of the Society of Jesus.

Academic performance 
St. Francis students finished second and third nationally in the National Examination Council exam in 2014, while student Oluwatobi Raji also scored good results. The school also emerged as the winner of the schools challenge at kody and the kids, 2015. St. Francis was ranked 20th among the top 100 schools in Nigeria in 2015. In 2016, the school hosted the 18th Inter-House Sports competition (track and field competition).

Notable alumni

 Tana AdelanaTV-host and VJ
 Chika IkeNollywood actress

See also

 Catholic Church in Nigeria
 Education in Nigeria
 List of schools in Lagos
 List of Jesuit schools

References

1990 establishments in Nigeria
Educational institutions established in 1990
Jesuit secondary schools in Nigeria
Catholic schools in Lagos